A reactimeter is a diagnostic device used in nuclear power plants (and other nuclear applications) for measuring the reactivity of the nuclear chain reaction (in inhours) of fissile materials as they approach criticality.

Measuring instruments